The n Series is a Dell product line that does not ship with a pre-installed version of Microsoft Windows. Apparently prohibited from shipping computers without an operating system by an existing licensing agreement with Microsoft, Dell instead ships these systems with either the open-source FreeDOS operating system or the Ubuntu Linux distribution not preinstalled, but on install disks.

The company has come under fire for making the FreeDOS and Linux-powered machines no cheaper and more difficult to purchase than identical systems running Windows. Despite its technological advances, it is often criticized more than the average computing device.

References

External links
Dell n Series Service in Delhi, india
Dell and Linux
Interview with Michael Dell on Desktop Linux

n Series